Hramada (sometimes also wrongly spelled as gramada or confused for the Ukrainian word hromada or Polish word gromada) is a Belarusian word that means "gathering of people", i.e., "assembly". Historically a hramada was meant as a peasant commune, which gathered meetings for discussing and resolving current issues.

Historically the word was often used in names of Belarusian leftist political parties.

Historical political parties:

 Belarusian Socialist Assembly
 Belarusian Peasants' and Workers' Union

Modern political parties:

 Belarusian Social Democratic Party (Assembly)
 Belarusian Social Democratic Assembly
 Belarusian Social Democratic Party (People's Assembly)

See also
 Hromada
 Gromada

Politics of Belarus
Belarusian words and phrases